A Case of Need is a medical thriller/mystery novel written by Michael Crichton, his fourth novel and the only under the pseudonym Jeffery Hudson. It was first published in 1968 by The World Publishing Company (New York) and won an Edgar Award in 1969.

The novel was adapted into the 1972 film The Carey Treatment, and the book was re-released in 1993 under Crichton's own name. The novel tackles the issues of abortion and racism as they were in late 1960s America.

Plot summary

Dr. John Berry, the protagonist, is a pathologist working in Boston during the 1960s, a time when abortion was illegal in the United States. The story opens with an introduction of the various requirements and challenges of the medical profession during the era. Subsequently, Dr. Berry is notified that his friend, an obstetrician named Arthur Lee, has been arrested and accused of performing an illegal abortion that led to the death of Karen Randall, a member of a prominent Boston medical dynasty. Berry does not believe the allegations, but the situation is further complicated by the fact that Lee is already well-known within the medical community as an abortion provider and that Berry has in the past helped Lee disguise medical samples to hide the fact that Lee's dilation and curettage patients were pregnant.

After visiting his friend in jail, Berry sets out to prove Lee's innocence. He investigates the personal life of the dead woman, creating an accurate portrait of her past, psychology, and character. During his search, which lasts several days, vandals attack Lee's home. The protagonist's knowledge of medicine and law are helpful in overcoming various barriers in his search, including a hostile police captain and bribes from the scion of the Randall family itself: Karen's father, a well-established (though mediocre) doctor.

Eventually, with the aid of an unscrupulous lawyer named Wilson, Berry is able to obtain solid evidence showing Karen Randall's uncle (who had already performed three previous abortions for her) to be the culprit. Nonetheless, Berry is troubled by this conclusion and continues his investigation despite Wilson's displeasure. Eventually, he discovers that Karen's drug-dealing friends, Roman and Angela, performed the botched abortion, but Berry is attacked and sent to the hospital before he can reveal his discovery. Subsequently, Berry's attacker, who turns out to be Karen's African-American boyfriend, is also brought in an ambulance, dead after a fatal fall. The actual abortion care provider attempts to commit suicide. Berry forces her to confess in the hospital by threatening her with what she believes is an excruciatingly painful dose of Nalorphine (but is actually water).

Berry continues to be suspicious about Karen's boyfriend's death, and ultimately forces one of his old friends and colleagues (the uncle of the woman who did Karen's abortion) to admit to his involvement before turning him in to the police. However, despite being proven innocent, Lee's reputation has been ruined, and he decides to move to California. The novel ends with several appendices describing some lesser-known aspects of the medical profession and a postscript discussing current problems in medicine, including abortion.

Background
Crichton had published several novels under the pseudonym John Lange but felt since this one was more serious than the Lange books it needed to come out under a different name. He planned to write further Jeffrey Hudson books about medical fiction, but this did not come about.  The pen name Jeffrey Hudson came from the name of a dwarf in the time of King Charles I of England, who was served to the monarch in a pie and later captured by Barbary Pirates.

The novel was republished in hardcover under Crichton's name in 1993. Crichton was furious at this, called the action "despicable", and said it misled the public into thinking it was a new novel.

References

1968 American novels
American mystery novels
American thriller novels
American novels adapted into films
Edgar Award-winning works
English-language novels
Novels about abortion
Novels by Michael Crichton
Novels set in Boston
Works published under a pseudonym